Guddi Gudda was a 1956 Punjabi-language film from Pakistan, directed by Wali Sahib.

Cast
Musarrat Nazir
Sudhir
Asha Posley
Agha Talish
M. Ajmal
Ghulam Mohammad

Music
Film music was by Ghulam Ahmed Chishti, film song lyrics were written by Wali Sahib. Playback singers of the film songs were Munawar Sultana, Zubaida Khanum and Abdul Shakoor Bedil.

References

External links

1956 films
Punjabi-language Pakistani films
Pakistani black-and-white films
1950s Punjabi-language films
Films scored by Ghulam Ahmed Chishti